Jirapong Meenapra (RTGS: Chiraphong Minaphra, born 11 May 1993) is a Thai sprinter who specialises in the 100 metres. He was born in Surat Thani, Thailand.

At the inaugural 2010 Summer Youth Olympics, he finished fifth in the 100 metres.

References

External links

1993 births
Living people
Jirapong Meenapra
Athletes (track and field) at the 2010 Summer Youth Olympics
Asian Games medalists in athletics (track and field)
Athletes (track and field) at the 2010 Asian Games
Athletes (track and field) at the 2014 Asian Games
Jirapong Meenapra
Jirapong Meenapra
Medalists at the 2010 Asian Games
Southeast Asian Games medalists in athletics
Jirapong Meenapra
Jirapong Meenapra
Competitors at the 2013 Southeast Asian Games
Competitors at the 2015 Southeast Asian Games
Competitors at the 2019 Southeast Asian Games
Jirapong Meenapra
Jirapong Meenapra